Mikhail Georgievich Kozell (October 20, 1911 – July 26, 1993) was a Soviet Russian painter and Art teacher, who lived and worked in Leningrad (now Saint-Petersburg), and who belonged to the Leningrad School of Painting, most famous for his landscape painting.

Biography
Kozell was born October 20, 1911 in Astrakhan. In 1939 Mikhail Kozell graduated from Ilya Repin Institute in Isaak Brodsky workshop. Pupil of Mikhail Bernshtein, Arcady Rylov, Alexander Lubimov, Vladimir Serov.
Since 1949 Mikhail Kozell participated in Art Exhibitions. Painted landscapes, genre pictures, sketches from the life.

Mikhail Kozell was a member of the Saint Petersburg Union of Artists since 1962. In 1948-1991 Mikhail Kozell worked as an Art teacher of Secondary Art School of Ilya Repin Institute in Leningrad.

Mikhail Georgievich Kozell died on July 26, 1993, in Saint Petersburg at 82 years of age. Paintings by Mikhail Kozell reside in Art museums and private collections in Russia, U.S., England, Japan, and throughout the world.

See also
Leningrad School of Painting
List of Russian artists
List of 20th-century Russian painters
List of the Russian Landscape painters
Saint Petersburg Union of Artists

References

Bibliography
Across the Motherland Exhibition of Leningrad artists. Catalogue. - Leningrad: Khudozhnik RSFSR, 1974. -p. 14.
Exhibition of modern Soviet Painting. 1976. Gekkoso Gallery. Catalogue. — Tokyo, 1976. - р.97,154.
Exhibition of modern Soviet Painting. 1978. Gekkoso Gallery. Catalogue. — Tokyo, 1978. - р.58.
Mikhail Kozell. Painting. Drawings. Exhibition of works. Catalogue. - Leningrad: Khudozhnik RSFSR, 1989.
Matthew C. Bown. Dictionary of 20th Century Russian and Soviet Painters 1900-1980s. - London: Izomar, 1998. , .
Sergei V. Ivanov. Unknown Socialist Realism. The Leningrad School.- Saint Petersburg: NP-Print Edition, 2007. – pp. 15, 20, 361, 390, 392, 394–398, 400–405, 445. , .

1911 births
1993 deaths
People from Astrakhan
People from Astrakhan Governorate
20th-century Russian painters
Russian male painters
Soviet painters
Members of the Leningrad Union of Artists
Socialist realist artists
Leningrad School artists
Repin Institute of Arts alumni
20th-century Russian male artists